Zamia obliqua is a species of plant in the family Zamiaceae. It is found in Colombia and Panama. Its natural habitat is subtropical or tropical moist lowland forests. It is threatened by habitat loss.

References

obliqua
Near threatened plants
Taxonomy articles created by Polbot
Taxa named by Alexander Braun